Illinois Route 137 (IL 137) is a  state highway in northeast Illinois. It runs from the Wisconsin Border north of Winthrop Harbor south to North Chicago, west to Libertyville, and then back northwest to Grayslake, terminating at IL 83 just south of IL 120.

The eastern portion of Illinois 137 carries part of the Amstutz Expressway, a short freeway between downtown Waukegan and Lake Michigan.

Route description 
Illinois 137 is called Buckley Road in the northwest-southeast segment, as well as the east–west segment east of Illinois Route 21 (Milwaukee Avenue). Between these segments, in northern Libertyville, business addresses use Peterson Road. However, street signs name it Buckley Road, which continues west as Illinois 137 turns northwest. In North Chicago, at the east end of the Buckley Road alignment, the route turns north where it cuts Naval Station Great Lakes into two areas, and becomes Sheridan Road for most of its remaining length to the Wisconsin state line. Sheridan Road  continues north as Wisconsin Highway 32.

History
In 1928, IL 137 was established. Initially, it ran from IL 1 to St. Francisville. This routing resembled a spur of IL 1. In 1929, the easternmost portion of IL 137 (from St. Francisville to Indiana state line) was removed. In 1936, without any significant changes to the routing since 1929, the designation was removed.

In 1953, IL 137 was established again. It initially ran from IL 21/IL 63 (now just IL 21) to IL 42 (now Sheridan Road) on its present-day routing. In 1973, one year after the decommissioning of IL 42, IL 137 was cut back from Sheridan Road to IL 131. By 1975, IL 63 was decommissioned. As a result, a portion of IL 21 moved from serving Grayslake to Gurnee. IL 137 then extended west via former IL 21. By 1979, the Amstutz Expressway opened between Grand Avenue and Greenwood Avenue. However, at first, the expressway was not signed. By 1992, IL 137 extended north all the way to WIS 32 at state line. The extension followed parts of the former IL 42 and the Amstutz Expressway; acquiring part of IL 173 from Zion to Winthrop Harbor.

Amstutz Expressway
The Amstutz Expressway has a history of planning (which mostly did not come to fruition) and films.

The southern portion of the proposed expressway (FAP 437) would have traveled from around the I-94 (Tri-State Tollway)/IL 137 (Buckley Road) interchange to the Grand Avenue interchange. Back then, the expressway ended at Grand Avenue.

It was built in the 1970s to ease traffic in Waukegan’s downtown area, but is now also known as the "road to nowhere".  The , four-lane highway was intended to be a connecting route for the downtown area, but a critical link through the neighboring village of North Chicago was never built, and the factories that the expressway was designed to serve have since closed.  Today, the thoroughfare carries fewer than 15,000 vehicles per day. Because it is used so little, this short stretch of highway has been the setting for filming such movies and television programs as Groundhog Day, The Blues Brothers, The Ice Harvest, Batman Begins, and Chicago Fire.

In the early 2000s, proposals were made to remove the expressway, thus narrowing the space needed for roadway, and then moving the nearby railroad right-of-way to the unused expressway land as part of a revitalization project for the lakefront area. Illinois 137 follows the entire length of the expressway, and received this designation in 1994 when Illinois 137 was extended north to the Wisconsin state line.

The Amstutz Expressway was named after Mel Amstutz, a former Lake County Highway Superintendent. In 2007, legislation was pending in the Illinois General Assembly to rename the expressway, Bobby Thompson Expressway, after the former mayor of North Chicago. The bill received unanimous support in the Illinois House of Representatives, but has not yet been voted on by the Illinois Senate.  This name change took effect in 2010.

Major intersections

References

External links

Illinois Highway Ends: Illinois 137

137
137
Transportation in Lake County, Illinois